William Peter "Liam" Clifford (27 June 1876 – 24 February 1949) was the ninth president of the Gaelic Athletic Association (1926–1928).

Involved in the dairy co-operative movement in Limerick and neighbouring Clare for many years, Clifford became the Department of Agriculture’s chief dairy inspector in 1936.

Clifford was chairman of the Limerick county board for 20 years, and also had a term as chairman of the Munster board.

Under Liam Clifford's leadership, the Tipperary team toured America, and the GAA decided to allocate ten percent of gate receipts for ground development, which led to the provision of grounds throughout the country, for which Clifford has been called "the great apostle of grounds development".

References

 

1876 births
1949 deaths
Chairmen of county boards of the Gaelic Athletic Association
Chairmen of Gaelic games governing bodies 
Limerick County Board administrators
Munster Provincial Council administrators
Presidents of the Gaelic Athletic Association